Michael Tobin  (born 16 January 1964) is an English technology entrepreneur, author and philanthropist. He was CEO of FTSE 250 data centre operator. Further In 2014 he was awarded an OBE for his ‘Services to the Digital Economy' in The Queen's Birthday Honours List.

Career

Business career

Following roles at ICG, GlobalServe, Rockwell Corp, Goupil, Tricord, ICL and Fujitsu Tobin joined Redbus as Sales and Marketing Director. Becoming CEO in 2003, he led the merger between competitors Redbus and Telecity. In 2006 Tobin became CEO of the newly formed TelecityGroup. Michael implemented Telecity’s ‘gold standard’ membership of the Green Grid global consortium, and led Telecity to achieve the Carbon Trust Standard in 2010; the first data centre operator to do so.

In 2014 he stepped down from TelecityGroup following reported tensions with the board of directors, and founded Tobin Ventures Ltd.

Non-executive Directorships and Board roles

Tobin holds many non executive roles internationally which include: AudioBoom, Pulsant, Bigblu Broadband (formerly Satellite Solutions Worldwide Plc (Europasat)), Ultraleap, North C Data Centres, Sungard, Instrumental,  and ScaleUp Group.

Tobin is also an Advisory Board Member to LeaseWeb.

He previously held non-executive roles for Pentadyne Power Corporation, Pacnet, TeamRock, ThinkLondon, People Per Hour, Datapipe, Basefarm, Chayora, IXCellerate, Teraco Data Environments, Kinolt (formerly EURO-DIESEL), Park Place Technologies, Hurley Palmer Flatt, Plusserver and ITconic.

Charitable activities

Tobin started the CEO Sleepout UK charitable initiative in 2014 with Tony Hawkhead, CEO of Action for Children, where CEOs sleep out on the street to raise the profile of the issue of homelessness for children.

In 2016, Tobin raised over £100,000 by running 40 marathons in 40 days for The Prince's Trust.

In 2020, Tobin raised over £100,000 for The Brain Tumour Charity by trekking to the South Pole.

Michael is Founder of The Tobin Foundation and has raised over £100K to date for Education, Empowerment and Welfare of Children.

Michael has also been a champion of the Duke of Edinburgh Awards, Founder's Circle Member of the British Asian Trust, Chairman of the Loomba Foundation and fundraising member of Make a Wish Foundation.

Books

Forget Strategy Get Results: Radical Management Attitudes That Will Deliver Outstanding Success, 2014. 
Live Love Work Prosper: A Fresh Approach to Integrating Life and Work, 2018. 
Lifting the Floor: Revealed, the true stories hiding beneath the tiles of the data centre industry, 2020.

Awards

In 2014 Michael Tobin was recognised with an Order of the British Empire for his ‘services to the Digital Economy’ which was presented to him at an investiture ceremony by the Prince of Wales.   
Ernst & Young Entrepreneur of the Year (London regional winner) 2009, 2010 and (UK National winner) 2011. 
Business Person of the Year Award London Chamber of Commerce & Industry 2009 and 2010.
London Business Awards Business Turnaround of the Year 2005.
Named Number 31 of Britain's Top 50 Entrepreneurs 2005.
PWC Technology CEO of the Year 2007.
LCCI Business Growth Company of the Year 2008 & 2009.
Techmark Personal Achievement of the Year Award 2008.
UK Innovation Awards for IPO of the Year 2008.
DCE Outstanding Leader in Datacentres 2007 & 2008.
Lifetime Achievement Awards for Services to Datacentre Industry 2011
2016 The Prince's Trust Outstanding Individual Award.
Best Business Awards & Global Business Excellence Awards for Outstanding Non-Executive Director 2016.
Broadgroup Datacentre Influencer of the Decade 2017.
Named Smith & Williamson Top 25 Power Individuals 2017.

References

External links 
Michael Tobin Blog
How You Made It: Interview With Michael Tobin OBE, Chairman Of Audioboom

Living people
Officers of the Order of the British Empire
1964 births